Outer Schwyz (formally , Canton of Schwyz Outer Territory) was a half-canton of Switzerland from 1831 to 1833.

In 1831 the three outer districts of Schwyz, centered on Pfäffikon, March and Einsiedeln, and the district of Küssnacht, wished to secede from Schwyz within the scope of the regeneration movement. They were mainly concerned by their political disadvantage in comparison to the more ancient part of the canton and the unwillingness of conservative elements to reform the canton's constitution.

The remaining half-canton was called Inner Schwyz; it comprised the older part of the canton as well as the community of Wollerau.

In January 1831 a provisional government of the half-canton was instituted at a people's assembly at Lachen. After further negotiations, the constitution was then agreed in April 1832.

In July 1833, [Inner] Schwyz invaded and occupied the district of Küssnacht under Colonel . The Confederal government then intervened militarily and forced the parties to unite. In October 1833, following negotiations, a new constitution was introduced, which provided for equal political rights throughout the whole canton.

The capital of Outer Schwyz alternated between Lachen and Einsiedeln.

References 

1830s in Switzerland
Cantons of Switzerland
1830s establishments in Switzerland
1833 disestablishments in Switzerland
States and territories established in 1831
States and territories disestablished in 1833